C-jun-amino-terminal kinase-interacting protein 4 is a scaffold protein that in humans is encoded by the SPAG9 gene.

Function 

Extracellular signals are transduced into cells through mitogen-activated protein kinases. The structural organization of these kinases into specific signaling domains is facilitated by scaffolding proteins involved in closely tethering different kinases so that successive phosphorylation events can occur. The protein encoded by this gene is a scaffolding protein that brings together mitogen-activated protein kinases and their transcription factor targets for the activation of specific signaling pathways. This gene which is abundantly expressed in testicular haploid germ cells encodes a protein that is recognized by sperm-agglutinating antibodies and implicated in infertility.

Clinical significance 

SPAG9 is a potential biomarker for early cervical carcinoma bladder cancer,  and lung cancer.

Interactions 

SPAG9 has been shown to interact with MAX.

References

Further reading